John Hillcoat (born 16 December 1970) is a Scottish former professional footballer who played as a goalkeeper.

Career

Playing
Hillcoat is a former Dunfermline Athletic, Clyde, Hamilton Academical, Partick Thistle, Clydebank, Morton, Queen of the South, St Mirren, Dumbarton, Stranraer, Ayr United, Brechin City and Stenhousemuir goalkeeper.

In November 2008, Hillcoat joined St Johnstone as cover, but was then released at the end of December.

Coaching
Hillcoat left Stenhousemuir in May 2008 to take up a position as goalkeeping coach at East Stirlingshire. In December 2008 he took up a similar position at Alloa Athletic.

Personal life
Hillcoat grew up in Linwood, Renfrewshire. He currently writes a column for the Sunday Mail newspaper.

References

External links

 John Hillcoat's Column in The Sunday Mail

1970 births
Living people
Footballers from Paisley, Renfrewshire
Association football goalkeepers
Scottish footballers
Dunfermline Athletic F.C. players
Clyde F.C. players
Hamilton Academical F.C. players
Partick Thistle F.C. players
Clydebank F.C. (1965) players
Greenock Morton F.C. players
Queen of the South F.C. players
Dumbarton F.C. players
St Mirren F.C. players
Stranraer F.C. players
Ayr United F.C. players
Brechin City F.C. players
Stenhousemuir F.C. players
East Stirlingshire F.C. players
St Johnstone F.C. players
Scottish sportswriters
Scottish Football League players
Scottish Premier League players